Sidney Parsons (April 11, 1893 – April 22, 1955) was a Canadian politician, mayor of Edmonton, Alberta, and candidate for election to the Legislative Assembly of Alberta.

Early life

Parsons was born on April 11, 1893  in Revelstoke, near to Plymouth, Devon, England.  He was educated in Plymouth, but he and his parents immigrated to New Jersey in the early 1900s.  He attended technical schools there, and began work as a bricklayer with the Standard Oil Company in Bayonne, New Jersey.

In 1910, he moved to Edmonton, where he enlisted in the armed forces to fight in World War I.  He served with the 49th Battalion, under the command of fellow future mayor William Antrobus Griesbach.  Upon his return to Canada, Parsons married Gertrude Florence Smitt on January 8, 1918; the pair had three sons.

In his post-war life, Parsons was active in the labour movement and served as an executive officer of the Edmonton Trades & Labour Council (he served as its president from 1941 until 1945).

Political career

Parsons first sought elected office in the 1931 Edmonton election, when he ran for Edmonton City Council as an aldermanic candidate.  He finished seventh of fifteen candidates, and was not elected.  He fared similarly in the 1932 and 1934  elections.

In the 1935 provincial election, Parsons ran as a Labour candidate in the riding of Edmonton; he finished last of twenty-seven candidates, winning only fifty-two votes.

After this defeat, he returned to municipal politics, and was finally elected alderman in the 1938 election, finishing fourth of thirteen candidates.  He was re-elected in 1940 (finishing fourth of eighteen candidates), 1942 (third of twelve candidates), 1944 (third of twelve), 1946 (fourth of thirteen), and 1948 (first of twelve) elections.

He resigned halfway through his two-year aldermanic term to run for mayor in the 1949 election.  He narrowly won the five candidate field, and was elected to a two-year term.  He sought re-election in the 1951 election, but was soundly defeated by William Hawrelak.  He did not return to public life thereafter.

Personal life, death, and legacy

In later life, Parsons was involved in veterans organizations.  He was president of the Ex-Servicemen's Association and was an executive member of the Montgomery branch of the Royal Canadian Legion.  He also served as a labour representative on the Edmonton Hospital Board.

Sidney Parsons died April 22, 1955, after a cerebral embolism and was buried at the Edmonton Municipal Cemetery.

Parsons Road and Parsons Industrial, both in Edmonton, are named in his honour.

References

Edmonton Public Library biography of Sidney Parsons
City of Edmonton biography of Sidney Parsons
Report to the Edmonton City Council Executive Committee including a list of aldermen who have been honoured in the names of Edmonton's features

1893 births
1955 deaths
Mayors of Edmonton
Bricklayers
Canadian military personnel of World War I
People from South Hams (district)
English emigrants to Canada
English emigrants to the United States
Canadian trade unionists
Dominion Labor Party (Alberta) candidates in Alberta provincial elections
20th-century Canadian politicians